Attur or Atturu is a  village coming under Kemral post office in Dakshina Kannada (South Kanara) district of Karnataka state in India. It is near to Kinnigoli town. Nandini river originates from eastern part of Kateel at Muchur and the origin is further up to 20km near small village arteri. There is a bridge connecting north and south near a place called Kayer Muger from where people can go to famous place called Nellitheertha. The village is famous for Attur Udupa's Panchangam  (Almanac) for Hindus, which is widely followed in the district. The Udupa family of Attur - Bailu brings out the almanac.

Nearby Places 
 Mangalore
 Kateel
 Pakshikere
 Kinnigoli
 Mulki
 Haleangadi
 Suratkal

External links 

 Population
 Suragiri Temple

Villages in Dakshina Kannada district